Gregory Jackson (born 1974) is an American mixed martial arts (MMA) trainer who co-owns Jackson Wink MMA Academy in Albuquerque, New Mexico, widely considered one of the top MMA training centers in the world. Jackson has trained many successful fighters, including current  UFC Heavyweight Champion Jon Jones, former UFC Welterweight Champion Georges St-Pierre, former UFC Women's Bantamweight Champion Holly Holm, former Light Heavyweight Champion Rashad Evans, and a roster of other UFC contenders and World Extreme Cagefighting champions.

History

Greg Jackson was born in Washington D.C. to Kris and Jim Jackson, who were Quakers originally from the Midwest. Jackson and his family moved to Albuquerque, New Mexico when he was three years old. Jackson came from a family of wrestlers (his father, brother, and uncle were all champions in the sport). Jackson grew up in a rough neighborhood, and began learning martial arts to defend himself. As a result, he was suspended from school for instigating fights on more than one occasion.  In 1992, after graduating from Rio Grande High School, Jackson founded his own martial art, Gaidojutsu, which combines rudimentary techniques from catch wrestling and Muay Thai with basic judo locks. His school officially turned into an MMA school in 2000. In 2007, Jackson teamed up with striking coach Mike Winkeljohn, which was a seminal moment for Jackson's academy; since then, the gym has been known as Jackson Wink MMA Academy (JW MMA Academy), representing the partnership between Jackson and Winkeljohn.

Awards
Greg Jackson and his gyms have won five World MMA Awards altogether. He won the Coach of the Year award in 2009, 2010 and 2011. His old gym, Greg Jackson Fighting Systems won the Gym of the Year award in 2009. The contemporary Jackson-Wink MMA Academy won the same award in 2015.

Books
In 2009, Jackson released an instructional book about his fighting style called Jackson's MMA - The Stand Up Game. In 2010, Jackson released another instructional book about his ground fighting style called Jackson's MMA - The Ground Game.

Reality television
On February 5, 2013, Jackson signed with Bellator to coach on the promotion's reality series titled Fight Master: Bellator MMA.

References

External links
Jacksons Wink MMA Academy - Official Website

Mixed martial arts trainers
Martial arts school founders
Living people
Sportspeople from Albuquerque, New Mexico
1974 births